Coleus australis, synonyms Plectranthus australis and Plectranthus parviflorus, known as little spurflower or cockspur flower, is a shrub, occurring in Hawaii, Polynesia and Australia. Non aromatic, between 10 and 70 cm high. The habitat is shady moist areas, including eucalyptus forest and rainforest. A widespread species, in rocky areas and beside streams. Attractive blue and white flowers may occur throughout the year.

Uses
An ornamental plant.

References

 

australis
Flora of New South Wales
Flora of Victoria (Australia)
Flora of Hawaii